The Judge Child was an extended storyline in the comic strip Judge Dredd that ran in progs 156-181 of British comic magazine  2000 AD, in 1980. It introduced Owen Krysler, a powerful psychic character referred to as the Judge Child. Written by John Wagner and drawn by Mike McMahon, Brian Bolland and Ron Smith, the story also introduced the popular villain "Mean Machine" Angel and the future chief judge Judge Hershey, as well as drastically expanding the scope of the Judge Dredd universe. Consequences of the Judge Child story affected a number of plotlines for the next eighteen years, as well as leading to a notable sequel, City of the Damned. The story is also notable as introducing Alan Grant as Wagner's long-term co-writer of the series (beginning in the final episodes set on Xanadu).

Synopsis

Judge Feyy, a dying member of Psi Division has a precognitive vision that Mega-City One will be destroyed unless the Judges can find the "Judge Child", a boy called Owen Krysler with extreme telepathic and precognitive powers. He also has a birthmark on his head shaped like the Judges' Eagle. Krysler is destined to rule Mega-City One in its direst hour. Dredd is sent after the boy and tracks him across the Cursed Earth to Texas City where the Judge Child falls into the hands of the Angel Gang who escape from Earth. Dredd uses the ship Justice 1 to pursue the gang and the Child across a number of star systems and through various strange encounters with alien worlds.

Dredd becomes convinced that only by using Oracle Spice will he be able to find the Child, and after further dangerous adventures he gains this on the planet Necros. Oracle Spice gives precognitive powers to whoever takes it, but is very dangerous to the inexperienced user. Dredd orders a member of the Justice 1 crew, Judge Lopez, to take the Oracle Spice. This kills Lopez, but not before he reveals that the location of the Judge Child is known by the 'Jigsaw Man,' whom Dredd traces to the planet Ab. The 'Jigsaw Man' is a human called Prosser who had been the pilot of a spaceship hijacked by the Angel Gang, who are heading to the free robot planet of Xanadu. Prosser's nickname stems from the fact that once on Ab he contracted the alien wasting disease known as "Jigsaw Disease", which causes the victims to geometrically vanish piece by random piece. Just before he dies he tells Dredd that he believes the Judge Child is evil, because it was the Judge Child who caused him to catch the disease in the first place, apparently intentionally.

Dredd begins to doubt the mission but continues to Xanadu where he confronts and kills most of the Angel Gang, who had also begun to suspect the boy had been manipulating them. However the last of the Angel Gang is killed by the Judge Child himself. Finally having hold of the Judge Child, Dredd looks into his eyes and sees that he is evil and unfit to rule. Believing that the ruler of his city has to be pure and uncorrupted, Dredd abandons him on the planet and returns home - to the exasperation of the remaining Justice 1 crew.

Sequels

For deliberately failing in his mission Dredd himself had to be judged, in the story's epilogue Block War in prog 182. This story introduced another major character, Judge McGruder, who thought that Dredd had exceeded his authority.

In a sequel called Destiny's Angels, the Judge Child was executed for attempting to assassinate Dredd in revenge for depriving him of the opportunity to rule Mega-City One. In McGruder's eyes this vindicated Dredd's earlier judgement of him, and she authorised the execution herself.

Krysler returned in City of the Damned, this time as a deformed but much more powerful telepath called The Mutant.  This version of Krysler was a clone, grown from cultures taken from the original by The Grunwalder, the then-ruler of Xanadu.  This storyline completed the Judge Child arc, with Dredd noting that Feyy (the original pre-cog judge) was wrong in one important respect - Krysler was not the saviour of the city, but the doom of it instead.

In other media
Although the Judge Child himself does not feature in the 1995 Judge Dredd film, the Angel Family appear as secondary villains and are depicted very similarly to their original versions from this story arc. The film's iteration of Mean Machine (played by Christopher Adamson) ends up killing Justice Fargo (Max von Sydow).

A brief visual reference to the Judge Child is made in the 2012 film Dredd.  During a shootout outside a cinema, a poster on the wall advertises a film called Krysler's Mark, featuring a young boy as the central character.

References

External links
"The Judge Child Saga review @ Upcoming4.me"

Judge Child